The Women's 50 metre butterfly competition of the 2018 FINA World Swimming Championships (25 m) was held on 13 and 14 December 2018.

Records
Prior to the competition, the existing world and championship records were as follows.

Results

Heats
The heats were started on 13 December at 09:40.

Swim-off
The swim-off was held on 13 December at 11:02.

Semifinals
The semifinals were held at 19:46.

Semifinal 1

Semifinal 2

Final
The final was held at 19:07.

References

Women's 50 metre butterfly